The 2009 Dartmouth Big Green football team was an American football team that represented Dartmouth College during the 2009 NCAA Division I FCS football season. Dartmouth tied for second-to-last in the Ivy League. Dartmouth averaged 4,103 fans per gam.

In their fifth consecutive year under head coach Eugene "Buddy" Teevens, his 10th year overall, the Big Green compiled a 2–8 record and were outscored 282 to 161. Tim McManus and Peter Pidermann were the team captains.  

The Big Green's 2–5 conference record tied with Yale for sixth place in the Ivy League standings. Dartmouth was outscored 170 to 118 by Ivy opponents.

Dartmouth played its home games at Memorial Field on the college campus in Hanover, New Hampshire.

Schedule

References

Dartmouth
Dartmouth Big Green football seasons
Dartmouth Big Green football